Yulayevo (Yulay) is a rural locality (a village) in Kurgatovsky Selsoviet, Mechetlinsky District, Bashkortostan, Russia. The population was 158 as of 2010, tatars There are 3 streets.

Geography 
Yulayevo is located 32 km northeast of Bolsheustyikinskoye (the district's administrative centre) by road. Kurgatovo is the nearest rural locality.

References 

Rural localities in Mechetlinsky District